Tied Up in Tinsel is a detective novel by Ngaio Marsh; it is the twenty-seventh novel to feature Roderick Alleyn, and was first published in 1972.  The novel takes place at a country house in England over the course of a few days during the Christmas season.

References

Roderick Alleyn novels
1972 British novels
Christmas novels
Collins Crime Club books
British detective novels